Ordinary Joe is an American drama television series that ran from September 20, 2021 to January 24, 2022 on NBC. The series, produced by 20th Television and Universal Television, is co-developed and co-executive produced by Garrett Lerner and Russel Friend. James Wolk plays the titular role. In March 2022, the series was canceled after one season.

Premise
The series centers on Joe Kimbreau as he makes a pivotal, life-changing decision at his graduation from Syracuse University. The show follows him on three parallel timelines, starting ten years after his graduation: as a police officer, following in his father's footsteps; as a music star, following his passion; and as a nurse, after he marries his college sweetheart.

Cast and characters

Main

 James Wolk as Joe Kimbreau, a man whose one fateful choice on the day of his college graduation has profound effects on who he becomes ten years later:
 Musician Joe: a famous musician who is married to Amy.
 Nurse Joe: a mild-mannered nurse who is married to Jenny, with whom Joe shares a son, Christopher.
 Officer Joe: A heroic police officer who is reunited with Amy after ten years.
 Natalie Martinez as Amy Kindelán, whom Joe meets on the day of his graduation: she is married to Joe, and about to launch a political career, in the "Musician Joe" timeline; she is married to Eric in the "Nurse Joe" timeline; and she is working for Congressman Diaz when Joe reenters her life after ten years in the "Officer Joe" timeline.
 Elizabeth Lail as Jenny Banks, Joe's college sweetheart: in the "Musician Joe" timeline, she is a high-powered attorney who reveals to Joe that she put their son up for adoption ten years before; in the "Nurse Joe" timeline, she is a paralegal who is married to Joe, but initially estranged from him, and together they are raising their son Christopher; and in the "Officer Joe" timeline, she is an assistant district attorney who is keeping the existence of her son with Joe secret from him.
 Charlie Barnett as Eric Payne, Joe's best friend: he is single and managing Joe in the "Musician Joe" timeline; he is a chef and is married to Amy in the "Nurse Joe" timeline; and he runs a pizza place and is married to Mallory in the "Officer Joe" timeline.

Recurring

 David Warshofsky as Frank Kimbreau, Joe's uncle, who in the "Officer Joe" timeline is an NYPD detective. In the "Musician Joe" timeline, he has become Joe's head of security. In the "Nurse Joe" timeline, he has become a homeless drunk, estranged from most of his family.  
 Anne Ramsay as Gwen Kimbreau, Joe's mother
 Adam Rodriguez as Bobby Diaz, a United States congressman who aspires to higher office
 John Gluck as Joe and Jenny's son with muscular dystrophy, who was given a different name in each timeline:
 Christopher ("Nurse Joe" timeline), cared for by a married Joe and Jenny.
 Lucas ("Officer Joe" timeline), raised by Jenny and her husband.
 Zeke ("Musician Joe" timeline), given up for adoption by Jenny years previously.
 Joe Carroll as Ray, Jenny's husband in the "Officer Joe" timeline
 Gabrielle Byndloss as Mallory, Eric's wife in the "Officer Joe" timeline
 Jason Burkey as Darren, Jenny's husband in the "Musician Joe" timeline
 Jack Coleman as Dr. Douglas Banks, Jenny's father
 Christine Adams as Regina Diaz, Bobby's wife

Notable guest cast
 David Paluck as Christopher Kimbreau Sr., Joe's police officer father who died on 9/11 (in "Requiem", "The Letter")
 Wynn Everett as Celeste Kimbreau, Joe's older sister (in "The Letter", "Thankful")
 Maurice P. Kerry as Officer Gary Winnick, saved by Joe's father on 9/11 (in "The Letter")

Episodes

Production

Development
The series was originally written as a pilot by executive producer Matt Reeves for ABC in 2006, based on a concept that Caleb Ranson had been developing for a separate British series for ITV, but neither program ended up moving forward. The project was revived a decade later and received a put pilot commitment by NBC on November 5, 2018. In January 2020, the series received a pilot order for the 2020–21 season and Adam Davidson was brought on as director the following month. The outbreak of the COVID-19 pandemic in March 2020 resulted in the series being pushed to the 2021–22 season. On March 31, 2021, NBC picked up the pilot to series. On March 4, 2022, NBC canceled the series after one season.

Casting
James Wolk was the first member to be cast in the series on February 19, 2020, in the titular role of Joe Kimbreau. He was joined the following month by Natalie Martinez and Charlie Barnett portraying the characters  Amy and Eric Payne respectively. In March 2021, it was announced that Elizabeth Lail would also be co-starring in the series. In June 2021, David Warshofsky was revealed to be a part of the series cast. In July 2021, Adam Rodriguez joined the cast in a recurring role. In August 2021, Jack Coleman, Christine Adams, Joe Carroll, Rushi Kota, Jason Burkey, and Gabrielle Byndloss joined the cast in recurring capacities.

Production design 
The show uses color palettes to distinguish among the three timelines: green hues when Joe is a nurse, blue hues when he is a cop, and red hues when he is a rock star.

Filming
Principal photography on the pilot began in Chicago, Illinois, in March 2020, but was suspended within a few days due to COVID-related shutdowns. Consequently, the pilot remained only partially filmed. Production on the pilot resumed in November 2020 and was completed the following month. Filming on the remainder of the first season commenced on July 27, 2021 in Atlanta, Georgia, and concluded on December 10, 2021.

Release

Broadcast
In May 2021, it was announced that the series would premiere in Fall 2021 and would air on Monday nights at 10 pm. On July 23, 2021, NBC released the first official trailer for the series. The series premiered on September 20, 2021 and concluded on January 24, 2022.

International
In Canada, the series aired on Citytv, with episodes being aired in simulcast with NBC.

In Malaysia, the series aired on PRIMEtime.

Reception

Critical response
The review aggregator website Rotten Tomatoes reports a 50% approval rating with an average rating of 6.3/10, based on 20 critic reviews. The website's critics consensus reads, "Ordinary Joe has an appealing start and premise, but it's hard to see whether it's  triple timelines will add up to a satisfactory season of television." Metacritic, which uses a weighted average, assigned a score of 64 out of 100 based on 15 critics, indicating "generally favorable reviews".

The show's use of multiple color palettes was described by a critic as "notable but not distracting" to distinguish among the three timelines: green when Joe is a nurse, blue when he is a cop, and orange when he is a rock star.

Ratings
Note: Live+3 day ratings have been used where Live+7 day ratings are unavailable.

See also
 If/Then
 Sliding Doors
 Awake, 2012 TV series

References

External links
 
 

2020s American drama television series
2021 American television series debuts
2022 American television series endings
Nonlinear narrative television series
English-language television shows
Fictional portrayals of the New York City Police Department
NBC original programming
Television productions suspended due to the COVID-19 pandemic
Television series by 20th Century Fox Television
Television series by Universal Television
Television series by 3 Arts Entertainment
Television shows set in New York City